Manuel Joachim de Franca (1808–1865), was a Portuguese-American painter.

He was born in Porto, Portugal and emigrated to Philadelphia where he lived and worked until 1842 before moving to St. Louis.

He died in St. Louis, Missouri on 22 August 1865.

References

Manuel Joachim de Franca on Artnet

1808 births
1865 deaths
Portuguese painters
Portuguese male painters
Artists from Porto
Romantic painters
Portuguese emigrants to the United States
19th-century Portuguese painters
19th-century American painters
American male painters
19th-century American male artists